San Antonio de Areco is a city in northern Buenos Aires Province, Argentina, and administrative seat of the partido of San Antonio de Areco.

San Antonio de Areco was founded in 1730, under the protection of a chapel inaugurated by José Ruiz de Arellano. It has been declared city of historic national interest by the Argentine Government and is recognized for being the homeland of Don Segundo Sombra, the immortal character of the novel written by Ricardo Güiraldes.  The city is the home of the Museo Gauchesco Ricardo Güiraldes.  Each year in November, the city holds the Día de la Tradición (Tradition Day) gaucho celebration.
Since 2001, San Antonio de Areco is sister city of Laredo, Texas in the United States.

Geographical features 
The city has 23,114 inhabitants (INDEC, 2010), against 17,764 inhabitants registered in the previous census (INDEC, 2001).

San Antonio de Areco is located in the north east region of Buenos Aires province.

The climate is humid subtropical.

Notable residents 
Juan José Güiraldes Ricardo Güiraldes' nephew and one time president of Aerolíneas Argentinas

External links

Tradition Festival- Event Schedule
Turismo en San Antonio de Areco - Tourism
Areco Ciudad - News
Secretary of Tourism
Don Segundo Sombra
Cheska Pastelería

Populated places in Buenos Aires Province
Populated places established in 1730